The Afro-Asian Club Championship, sometimes referred to as the Afro-Asian Cup, was a football competition endorsed by the Confederation of African Football (CAF) and Asian Football Confederation (AFC), contested between the winners of the African Champions' Cup and the Asian Club Championship, the two continents' top club competitions. The championship was modelled on the Intercontinental Cup (organised by Europe's UEFA and South America's CONMEBOL football federations and now replaced by the FIFA Club World Cup) and ran from 1987 to 1999.

History
The first two competitions held in 1986 and 1987 were contested over a single match; from 1988 until 1998 the competition was held in a two-legged tie format. The last winners were Moroccan side Raja Casablanca, who defeated South Korean side Pohang Steelers in 1998.

The competition was officially discontinued following a CAF decision on 30 July 2000, after AFC representatives had supported Germany in the vote for hosting the 2006 FIFA World Cup rather than South Africa (who eventually won the bid for the 2010 FIFA World Cup).

In February 2018, CAF President Ahmad Ahmad stated that CAF would consider re-introducing the competition.

Records and statistics

Finals

Results by club

Results by country

Results by continent

Winning coaches
The following table lists the winning coaches of the Afro-Asian Club Championship.

See also
Afro-Asian Cup of Nations
CAF Champions League
AFC Champions League
Copa Interamericana
Intercontinental Cup
FIFA Club World Cup

Notes
 A.   For clarity, years given in the winners' list do not necessarily correspond to the years when matches were actually played. The finals were always held between the African Champions' Cup winners from the earlier calendar year (given year minus 1) and the Asian Champions' Cup winners who won the title in the previous season (given year minus 1/given year), e.g. the inaugural 1986 final was held between 1985 African Champions' Cup winners FAR Rabat and the 1985–86 Asian Club Championship winners Daewoo Royals. However, FIFA designates at least some of these titles according to the year when the final matches were held.
B.  Korean club Busan IPark were known as Daewoo Royals until 2000.
C.  Japanese club JEF United Ichihara Chiba were founded as Furukawa Electric Soccer Club until 1991.
D.  Japanese club Tokyo Verdy were called Yomiuri FC from their foundation in 1969 until 1993.

References
General

Specific

 
Defunct Confederation of African Football club competitions
Defunct Asian Football Confederation club competitions
Defunct international club association football competitions in Africa
Defunct international club association football competitions in Asia
Recurring sporting events established in 1987
Recurring sporting events disestablished in 2000